The Nemean lion (Neméos léōn) was a monster in Greek mythology that lived at Nemea. Eventually, it was killed by Heracles (Hercules). Because its golden fur was impervious to attack, it could not be killed with mortals' weapons. Its claws were sharper than mortals' swords and could destroy any strong armour. In Bibliotheca, Photius wrote that the dragon Ladon, who guarded the golden apples, was his brother.

Parents
Hesiod has the Nemean lion as the offspring of Orthus and an ambiguous "she", often understood as probably referring to the Chimera, or possibly to Echidna or even Ceto. According to Hesiod, the lion was raised by Hera and sent to terrorise the hills of Nemea. According to Apollodorus, he was the offspring of Typhon. In another tradition, told by Aelian (citing Epimenides) and Hyginus, the lion was "sprung from" the moon-goddess Selene, who threw him from the moon at Hera's request.

First labour of Heracles

The first of Heracles' twelve labours, set by King Eurystheus (his cousin), was to slay the Nemean lion.

Heracles wandered the area until he came to the town of Cleonae. There, he met a boy who said that if Heracles slew the Nemean lion and returned alive within 30 days, the town would sacrifice a lion to Zeus; if he did not return within 30 days or he died, the boy would sacrifice himself to Zeus. Another version claims that he met Molorchos, a shepherd who had lost his son to the lion, saying that if he came back within 30 days, a ram would be sacrificed to Zeus. If he did not return within 30 days, it would be sacrificed to the dead Heracles as a mourning offering.

While searching for the lion, Heracles fetched some arrows to use against it, not knowing that its golden fur was impenetrable; when he found the lion and shot at it with his bow, he discovered the fur's protective property when the arrow bounced harmlessly off the creature's thigh. After some time, Heracles made the lion return to his cave. The cave had two entrances, one of which Heracles blocked; he then entered the other. In those dark and close quarters, Heracles stunned the beast with his club. He eventually killed it by strangling it with his bare hands.

After slaying the lion, he tried to skin it with a knife from his belt, but failed. He then tried sharpening the knife with a stone and even tried with the stone itself. Finally, Athena, noticing the hero's plight, told Heracles to use one of the lion's own claws to skin the pelt.

When Heracles returned on the thirtieth day carrying the carcass of the lion on his shoulders, King Eurystheus was amazed and terrified. Eurystheus forbade him ever again to enter the city; in the future, he was to display the fruits of his labours outside the city gates. Eurystheus warned him that the tasks set for him would become increasingly difficult. He then sent Heracles off to complete his next quest, which was to destroy the Lernaean Hydra.

Heracles wore the Nemean lion's coat after killing it, as it was impervious to the elements and all but the most powerful weapons. Others say that Heracles' armour was, in fact, the hide of the Lion of Cithaeron.

According to Alexander of Myndus, Heracles was helped in this labour by an Earth-born serpent, which followed him to Thebes and settled down in Aulis. It was later identified as the water snake which devoured the sparrows and was turned into stone in the prophecy about the Trojan War.

In art

Classical literature sources 
Chronological listing of classical literature sources for the Nemean Lion:

 Hesiod, Theogony 327 ff (trans. Evelyn-White) (Greek epic poetry C8th or C7th BC)
 Pindar, Isthmian Ode 6. 46 ff (trans. Conway) (Greek lyric poetry C5th BC)
 Aeschylus, Leon (fragment) (Aeschylus II trans. Weir Smyth Vol. p. 420) (Greek tragedy C5th BC)
 Sophocles, Trachinae 1064 ff (trans. Oates and O'Neil) (Greek tragedy C5th BC)
 Euripides, The Madness of Hercules 359 ff (trans. Way) (Greek tragedy C5th BC)
 Euripides, Hercules 556 ff (trans. Oates and O'Neil) (Greek tragedy C5th BC)
 Callimachus, Aetia Fragment 55 (trans. Trypanis) (Greek poetry C3rd BC)
 Callimachus, Uncertain Location Fragment 6 (108) (trans. Mair) (Greek poetry C3rd BC):
 Lycophron, Alexandra 1345 ff (trans. Mair) (Greek poetry C3rd BC)
 Scholiast on Lycophron, Alexandra 1345 ff (Callimachus and Lycophron Aratus trans. Mair 1921 p. 606)
 Theocritus, Idylls 25. 132 ff (trans. Rist) (Greek bucolic poetry C3rd BC)
 Diodorus Siculus, Library of History 4. 11. 3 (trans. Oldfather) (Greek history C1st BC)
 Lucretius, Of The Nature of Things 5. Proem 1 (trans. Leonard) (Roman philosophy C1st BC)
 Cicero, The Tusculan Disputations 9 (trans. Yonge) (Greco-Roman philosophy C1st BC)
 Ovid, Metamorphoses 9. 197 ff (trans. Melville) (Roman epic poetry C1st BC to C1st AD)
 Ovid, Heroides 9. 61 ff (trans. Showerman) (Roman poetry C1st BC to C1st AD)
 Ovid, Heroides 9. 87 ff
 Bacchylides papyrus, Fragment 9 (Greek Lyric trans. Campbell Vol. 4) (Greek poetry C1st AD)
 Bacchylides papyrus, Fragment 13
 Philippus of Thessalonica, The Twelve Labors of Hercules (The Greek Classics ed. Miller Vol 3 1909 p. 397) (Greek epigram C1st AD)
 Seneca, Hercules Furens 44 ff (trans. Miller) (Roman tragedy C1st AD)
 Seneca, Hercules Furens 83 ff
 Seneca, Hercules Furens 224 ff
 Seneca, Hercules Furens 798 ff
 Scholiast on Seneca, Hercules Furens 798 (Seneca's Tragedies trans. Miller 1938 1917 Vol 1 p. 73)
 Seneca, Hercules Furens 942 ff
 Seneca, Oedipus 38 ff (trans. Miller) (Roman tragedy C1st AD)
 Seneca, Agamemnon 829 ff (trans. Miller) (Roman tragedy C1st AD)
 Seneca, Hercules Oetaeus 17-30 (trans. Miller). (Roman tragedy C1st AD)
 Seneca, Hercules Oetaeus 411 ff
 Seneca, Hercules Oetaeus 1237 ff
 Seneca, Hercules Oetaeus 1813 ff
 Seneca, Hercules Oetaeus 1891 ff
 Statius, Thebaid 4. 824 ff (trans. Mozley) (Roman epic poetry C1st AD)
 Statius, Thebaid 6. 270 ff
 Ptolemy Hephaestion, New History Book 2 (summary from Photius Myriobiblon 190) (trans. Pearse) (Greek mythography C1st to C2nd AD)
 Ptolemy Hephaestion, New History Book 5
 Plutarch, Moralia, On the Fortune of Alexander, 341. 11 ff (trans. Babbitt) (Greek philosophy C1st AD to C2nd AD)
 Pseudo-Apollodorus, Bibliotheca 2. 74 - 76 (trans. Aldrich) (Greek mythography C2nd AD)
 Pausanias, Description of Greece 2. 15. 2 (trans. Jones) (Greek travelogue C2nd AD)
 Pausanias, Description of Greece 5. 11. 5
 Pausanias, Description of Greece 5. 25. 7
 Pausanias, Description of Greece 5. 26. 7
 Pausanias, Description of Greece 6. 5. 6
 Aelian, On Animals 12. 7 (trans. Scholfield) (Greek natural history C2nd AD)
 Aelian, Historical Miscellany 4. 5 (trans. Wilson) (Greek rhetoric C2nd to 3rd AD)
 Pseudo-Hyginus, Fabulae 30 (trans. Grant) (Roman mythography C2nd AD)
 Pseudo-Hyginus, Astronomica 2. 24
 Philostratus, Life of Apollonius of Tyana 6. 10 (trans. Conyreare) (Greek sophistry C3rd AD)
 Quintus Smyrnaeus, Fall of Troy 6. 208 ff (trans. Way) (Greek epic poetry C4th AD)
 Nonnos, Dionysiaca 25. 176 ff (trans. Rouse) (Greek epic poetry C5th AD)
 Boethius, The Consolation of Philosophy 4. 7. 13 ff (trans. Rand & Stewart) (Roman philosophy C6th AD)
 Suidas s.v. Nemea (trans. Suda On Line) (Greco-Byzantine Greek lexicon C10th AD)
 Tzetzes, Chiliades or Book of Histories 2. 232 ff (trans. Untila et al.) (Greco-Byzantine history C12 AD)
 Tzetzes, Chiliades or Book of Histories 2. 492 ff 
 Tzetzes, Chiliades or Book of Histories 7. 51 ff 
 Tzetzes, Chiliades or Book of Histories 7. 57 ff

See also
 History of lions in Europe
 Kangla Sha
 Nongshaba

Notes

References
 Caldwell, Richard, Hesiod's Theogony, Focus Publishing/R. Pullins Company (June 1, 1987). .
 Clay, Jenny Strauss, Hesiod's Cosmos,  Cambridge University Press, 2003. .
 Gantz, Timothy, Early Greek Myth: A Guide to Literary and Artistic Sources, Johns Hopkins University Press, 1996, Two volumes:  (Vol. 1),  (Vol. 2).
 Hard, Robin, The Routledge Handbook of Greek Mythology: Based on H.J. Rose's "Handbook of Greek Mythology", Psychology Press, 2004, . Google Books.
 Hesiod, Theogony, in Hesiod, Theogony, Works and Days, Testimonia, Edited and translated by Glenn W. Most. Loeb Classical Library No. 57. Cambridge, Massachusetts, Harvard University Press, 2018. . Online version at Harvard University Press.
 Most, G.W., Hesiod, Theogony, Works and Days, Testimonia, Edited and translated by Glenn W. Most, Loeb Classical Library No. 57, Cambridge, Massachusetts, Harvard University Press, 2018. . Online version at Harvard University Press.
 Smith, William; Dictionary of Greek and Roman Biography and Mythology, London (1873). "Heracles or Hercules"
 West, M. L., Hesiod: Theogony, Oxford University Press.

See also
 Master of Animals

External links
 

Labours of Hercules
Monsters in Greek mythology
Mythological lions
Children of Selene
Nemea